Latent human error is a term used in safety work and accident prevention, especially in aviation, to describe human errors which are likely to be made due to systems or routines that are formed in such a way that humans are disposed to making these errors. Latent human errors are frequently components in causes of accidents. The error is latent and may not materialize immediately, thus, latent human error does not cause immediate or obvious damage. Discovering latent errors is therefore difficult and requires a systematic approach. Latent human error is often discussed in aviation incident investigation, and contributes to over 70% of the accidents.

By gathering data about errors made, then collating, grouping and analyzing them, it can be determined whether a disproportionate amount of similar errors are being made. If this is the case, a contributing factor may be disharmony between the respective systems/routines and human nature or propensities. The routines or systems can then be analyzed, potential problems identified, and amendments made if necessary, in order to prevent future errors, incidents or accidents from occurring.

See also 
Air safety
Error

Further reading
 James Reason: Human Error, Cambridge University Press; 1st edition (October 26, 1990)

Citations 

 Defense Technical Information Center (1994-12-01). DTIC ADA492127: Behind Human Error: Cognitive Systems, Computers and Hindsight.

External links
 Erik Hollnagel, "The Elusiveness of "Human Error"", 2005
 Human error: models and management – James Reason British Medical Journal 2000;320:768–70 (Internet Archive)
 Human factors view of accident causation

Safety engineering
Error
Accidents
Human factors

References